You Could Be is the fourth release of the Montreal-based instrumental act Torngat.

Track listing
 "You Could Be" - 4:20
 "Bordeaux Boredom" - 2:51
 "Minute by Minute" - 5:58
 "Many Faces, Many Places" - 1:58
 "Mouton Noir" - 3:47
 "Gemini One" - 2:01
 "Suite A) Steps to a Lively Dance" - 4:01
 "Suite B) Chorale" - 1:07
 "Suite C) L'Ocean, La Nuit" - 3:46
 "A Super Hero Anthem" - 4:20
 "Celebrating New" - 4:49
 "Hammond Song: Being a Torngat" - 1:54

References

2007 albums
Torngat albums
Alien8 Recordings albums